Detour Ahead is an album by guitarist Randy Johnston which was recorded in 1998 and released on the HighNote label in 2001.

Reception

The AllMusic review by Alex Henderson stated "Detour Ahead is a solid album that Johnston should be proud to have in his catalog". In JazzTimes, Jim Ferguson wrote: "when Johnson plays, he leaves you with the feeling that he’s not just connecting the dots, but also really playing, listening and taking chances. It all adds up to another fine performance from a guitarist who’s going to be around for a long time".

Track listing
All compositions by Randy Johnson except where noted
 "Blues for Edward G." – 9:19
 "The Triangle Pose" – 6:58
 "A House Is Not a Home" (Burt Bacharach, Hal David) – 7:24
 "The End of a Love Affair" (Edward Redding) – 7:43
 "(They Long to Be) Close to You" (Bacharach, David) – 5:59
 "Two Step Snake" – 6:39
 "Detour Ahead" (Herb Ellis, John Frigo, Lou Carter) – 5:46
 "Dearly Beloved" (Jerome Kern, Johnny Mercer) – 5:29

Personnel
Randy Johnston – guitar
David "Fathead" Newman (tracks 1, 2, 5 & 6), Houston Person (track 1) – tenor saxophone
Joey DeFrancesco – organ 
Byron Landham – drums

References

HighNote Records albums
Randy Johnston (musician) albums
2001 albums
Albums recorded at Van Gelder Studio